Juvelius is a surname that may refer to:

 Eerik Juvelius (1718–1791), Finnish priest and writer
 Einar W. Juva (né Juvelius, 1892–1966), Finnish historian
 Mikko Juva (né Juvelius, 1918–2004), Finnish Lutheran archbishop
 Siiri Juva (née Juvelius, 1886–1974), Finnish writer
 Valter Juva (né Juvelius, 1865–1922), Finnish translator and writer